Shin Kwang-sik (born 16 February 1993) is a South Korean long-distance runner. In 2017, he competed in the men's marathon event at the 2017 World Championships in Athletics held in London, United Kingdom. In 2018, he competed in the men's marathon at the 2018 Asian Games held in Jakarta, Indonesia.

References

External links 
 

Living people
1993 births
Place of birth missing (living people)
South Korean male long-distance runners
South Korean male marathon runners
World Athletics Championships athletes for South Korea
Athletes (track and field) at the 2018 Asian Games
Asian Games competitors for South Korea
21st-century South Korean people